Love is the third studio album by Mexican singer Thalía, released on 7 October 1992, by the previously owned Televisa record label, Melody/Fonovisa, which now belongs to Univision Music Group. It was produced by the Spanish songwriter and producer Luis Carlos Esteban. The album was released in Mexico, some Central-American countries, the United States (with an alternative cover artwork), Spain, Greece and Turkey. In Mexico, two different versions of Love were released and later it would sell over 500,000 there, becoming her most successful album till the release of Primera Fila which sold over 600,000.

To celebrate Thalía's 25th anniversary as a solo artist, as for December 2014, this album is available in the digital platforms iTunes and Spotify.

Background and production
After releasing her second studio album Mundo de Cristal, Thalía went to present the TV show VIP Noche in Spain, where she met the Spanish composer and music producer Luiz Carlos Esteban, whom she asked for help to finalize the compositions of what would become her third solo album. To this album, songs with many different music genres were selected, like a cover of "Cien Años" which is a bolero song originally sang by Pedro Infante and "Love", a contemporary song in the dance music style of the 1990s. It also includes another three covers: "A la Orilla del Mar" ("At the Seashore"), "La Vie en rose" ("Life in pink") and "Nunca Sabrás" ("You'll Never Know"). Photography was in charge of the well-known photographer Adolfo Pérez Butron.

The first edition of Love included only 12 songs. However, as Thalía's soap opera, María Mercedes, was turning into a big success, a second version of the album was issued featuring the telenovela's theme song as a bonus track.

Promotion
Thalía presented Love for the first time on the Mexican television show Siempre en Domingo, hosted by Raúl Velasco, where she performed the first single, "Sangre", dedicated to her ex-boyfriend and manager Alfredo Díaz Ordaz who died in 1993. Shortly after the release of the album, Thalía appeared on the talk show Y Vero America Va, hosted by Verónica Castro, where she performed live numerous songs from the album. A special show named Love and her fantasies (from Spanish: Love y otras fantasías) was exhibited in Mexico and included seven music videos of the album's songs: "La Vie en rose", "El Día del Amor", "El Bronceador", "Love", "No trates de Engañarme", "Sangre" and "Déjame Escapar". After the success of the telenovela María Mercedes, it was re-released for the United States as Love and Other Fantasies, the show was broadcast by Univision and were produced by Televisa in 1993, it included the music video for Maria Mercedes and four live performances of Thalía's singles: "En la Intimidad", "Pienso en Ti", "Sudor" and "Amarillo Azul". Later Thalía's songs "Sangre", "Love" and "Flor de Juventud" received another music videos. They were made and shown exclusively on Siempre en Domingo TV show.

Singles
"Sangre": The lead single from Love, it was released in 1992 and was written by Thalía herself. She dedicated it to her then future husband, which died before the marriage. The song reached the number five position in Mexico City.
"María Mercedes": The second single, included in the re-released edition of Love, it also appears as the theme song of Thalía's soap opera María Mercedes. It peaked #10 in Mexico City. A remixed version was included in the tracklist of the digital download and streaming versions.
"Love": The third single from the album, it was released in 1993. In the TV special "Love Thalía y otras fantasias" a video with Thalía and two dancers dressed in black dancing the song was included. The song reached position number three in Mexico City. Two remixed versions were included in the single: "Club Remix" (7:31) and "Nights Club Mix" (6:52).
"La Vie en rose (La Vida en Rosa)": The fourth and final single from the album, it is a cover of Édith Piaf's song, the arrangement of the song resembles the same used by Grace Jones in her 1977 album, Portfolio. An edited version was included in the tracklists of the digital download and streaming version.

Commercial reception
The album sold 200,000 copies in Mexico in the first month of release and later was certified Platinum + Gold (equivalent of 350,000 copies sold at the time). Eventually, Love sold 500,000 copies there. The album's lead single peaked at number two in her native country. The album was certified Gold in Philippines and Thalía received both En éxtasis and Love certifications in her second visit to the country.

Track listing

Charts

Certifications and sales

References

1992 albums
Thalía albums
Spanish-language albums
Fonovisa Records albums